Remo Januzzi (14 January 1917 – 1984)  was a Brazilian professional footballer who has played for São Paulo FC as a midfielder, and scored 107 goals in 348 matches. In 1960, also managed São Paulo as a caretaker for 14 opportunities.

Honours

São Paulo FC
Campeonato Paulista:
Champions (5): 1943, 1945, 1946, 1948, 1949

References

1917 births
1984 deaths
Association football midfielders
Brazilian footballers
São Paulo FC players
Sportspeople from Minas Gerais